Ralph William Hill Jr. (April 28, 1930March 29, 2021) was an American lawyer, pastor, and politician.

Personal life
Ralph William Hill Jr. was born in Lynch, Nebraska on April 28, 1930, the son of Hazel Meachen and Ralph W. Hill.  He received a Bachelor of Arts from Phillips University in 1953, a Bachelor of Divinity from Drake University in 1957, and a Juris Doctor from Drake University Law School in 1965.  He married E. Lorraine Gulliver, and they had three children: Cathryn, Charles and Edward.  In 2000, he married Rose Mary Washington.  Hill died in Marshalltown, Iowa on March 29, 2021.

Career
In Liscomb, Iowa, Hill was a pastor at the Liscomb Church of Christ (1953–1956), the Bethel Grove Christian Church (1956–1963), and the United Church of Christ (beginning in August 1966); he was also a chaplain in the Iowa Army National Guard.

In Marshalltown, Iowa, Hill practiced law.  In Des Moines, Iowa, he made law as the Republican 51st-district representative to the Iowa House of Representatives during the 62nd (January 9, 1967January 12, 1969) and 63rd (January 13, 1969January 10, 1971) Iowa General Assemblies.

References

1930 births
2021 deaths
American military chaplains
Christian chaplains
Iowa lawyers
Iowa Republicans
members of the Iowa House of Representatives
people from Boyd County, Nebraska